Peter Terence Coffill (born 14 February 1957) is an English footballer. He plays as a midfielder, and made over 250 appearances in the Football League. Now retired from the professional game, he continues to play veteran's football, and has represented his country at over-50 level. Recently, he completely outplayed lookalike Ryan Joyce in a Sunday vets match also a teacher 20 years younger.

Now he is a teacher at Gaynes School Language College, in Upminster, Essex.

Career
Born in Romford, Essex, Coffill started his career in the Watford youth system. Manager Mike Keen gave 18-year-old Coffill his professional debut on 4 October 1975, in a 1–1 Fourth Division draw against Stockport County at Vicarage Road. He played regularly in his first two seasons as a professional, making 30 appearances in all competitions in 1975–76, and a further 31 in the following campaign. Keen was replaced as manager by Graham Taylor in June 1977, and the 1977–78 season was Coffill's last as a Watford player. He made his final appearance on 27 September 1977, scoring the winner in a 2–1 home win over A.F.C. Bournemouth. He joined Torquay United two months later, for a fee of £4,000.

Coffill played regularly for Torquay, making 122 league appearances over three and a half years, and scoring 11 goals. He was voted Torquay's Player of the Season in 1980–81, but at the end of the campaign transferred to Northampton Town for a transfer fee of £5,000. After 69 league appearances, he left Northampton at the end of his two-year contract, moving into non-league football with Aylesbury United and Kidderminster Harriers. He later became involved with the coaching side of the game, first as a coach with Chelmsford City in 1988, and after finishing his semi-professional playing career with Brantham Athletic and Bury Town, became assistant manager at Gravesend and Northfleet in 1991.

Coffill continues to play as an amateur. Although he never played for his country at youth or professional levels, he has played and scored for England in veteran's international matches (where there is a minimum age requirement).

References

1957 births
Living people
Footballers from Romford
Watford F.C. players
Torquay United F.C. players
Northampton Town F.C. players
Association football wingers
English Football League players
Aylesbury United F.C. players
Kidderminster Harriers F.C. players
Brantham Athletic F.C. players
Bury Town F.C. players
English footballers